1899 was the tenth season of County Championship cricket in England. Surrey won the championship for the first time in four years, but this title was their last until 1914. Surrey's season was dominated by draws, with fourteen out of 26 games drawn, just like the season in general – especially the Australian team's tour. Four of the five Test matches were drawn during the 19th series between the sides, but Australia won the second Test at Lord's and the series 1–0. This was their first Ashes series win in England since the original match in 1882.

Also, Worcestershire became the fifteenth county in the County Championship, debuting with an 11-run loss to Yorkshire despite earning a 78-run lead on first innings. George Wilson took eight for 70 in the first innings, which was a Worcestershire Championship record until Wilson beat it against Somerset in 1905. The debutants finished twelfth, though they only earned two wins in 12 games. Finally, Sussex' Ranjitsinhji became the first batsman to hit 2000 runs in a Championship season with 102 against Lancashire in August.

The season was a notable one for WG Grace. The First Test marked his final appearance for England (and the Test debut of Wilfred Rhodes). Also Grace played his last Championship game for Gloucestershire, having fallen out with them over his involvement with London County.

Honours
County Championship – Surrey
Minor Counties Championship – Buckinghamshire, Northamptonshire (shared title)
Wisden (Five Cricketers of the Season) – Joe Darling, Clem Hill, Arthur Jones, Monty Noble, Robert Poore

Ashes tour

County Championship

Final table 

 1 Games completed

Points system:

 1 for a win
 0 for a draw, a tie or an abandoned match
 -1 for a loss

Most runs in the County Championship

Most wickets in the County Championship

Overall first-class statistics

Leading batsmen

Leading bowlers

References

Annual reviews
 James Lillywhite's Cricketers' Annual (Red Lilly), Lillywhite, 1900
 Wisden Cricketers' Almanack 1900

External links
 Cricket in England in 1899

1899 in English cricket
1899